
Brzozów County is a unit of territorial administration and local government (powiat) in Subcarpathian Voivodeship, south-eastern Poland. It came into being on January 1, 1999, as a result of the Polish local government reforms passed in 1998.

As of 2019 its total population is 65,652, out of which the population of Brzozów is 7,463, and the rural population is 58,189.

Neighbouring counties
Brzozów County is bordered by Rzeszów County to the north, Przemyśl County to the east, Sanok County to the south-east, Krosno County to the west and Strzyżów County to the north-west.

Administrative division
The county is subdivided into six gminas (one urban-rural and five rural). These are listed in the following table, in descending order of population.

References

 
Land counties of Podkarpackie Voivodeship